Benjamin Franklin Stringfellow may refer to:

 Benjamin Franklin Stringfellow (1816–1891), 19th century railway tycoon
 Benjamin Franklin Stringfellow (1840–1913), Confederate spy